Coteaux-sur-Loire (literally Hillsides on Loire) is a commune in the department of Indre-et-Loire, central France. The municipality was established on 1 January 2017 by merger of the former communes of Saint-Patrice (the seat), Ingrandes-de-Touraine and Saint-Michel-sur-Loire.

See also 
Communes of the Indre-et-Loire department

References 

Communes of Indre-et-Loire